Thymalus is a genus of beetles belonging to the family Thymalidae.

The genus was described in 1802 by Pierre André Latreille.

The species of this genus are found in Eurasia and Northern America.

Species:
 Thymalus limbatus (Fabricius, 1787)

References

Cleroidea
Beetle genera
Beetles of Europe
Beetles of Asia
Beetles of North America